Gangadhara Nellore or G.D. Nellore is a town in Chittoor district of the Indian state of Andhra Pradesh. It is the mandal headquarters of Gangadhara Nellore mandal.
G D Nellore is suburban of Chittoor city

References 

Villages in Chittoor district
Mandal headquarters in Chittoor district